Nuorallatanssijan kuolema eli kuinka Pete Q sai siivet is a Finnish rock musical. It was performed in 1978.

References

External links

Finnish plays
1978 plays